New Woollam is an unincorporated community in Gasconade County, in the U.S. state of Missouri.

History
A community called Woollam has existed at two nearby locations, hence the names New Woollam and Old Woollam. A post office called Woollam was established in 1853, and remained in operation until 1932. The community most likely was named after a local merchant.

References

Unincorporated communities in Gasconade County, Missouri
Unincorporated communities in Missouri